"Chain of Fools" is a song written by Don Covay. Aretha Franklin first released the song as a single in 1967 and subsequently it appeared on many of her albums.  It hit number one on the Billboard Hot Rhythm & Blues chart and number two on Billboard's  Hot 100 chart.  In the lyrics, the singer has been with her boyfriend for five years but realizes she's one of his "chain of fools," women with whom he's been cheating.  Others tell her to leave him, but she says his love is too strong and she's too weak.  Yet someday, she predicts the chain will break.

History
Asked by Jerry Wexler, producer with Atlantic Records, to create songs for Otis Redding, Covay recorded a demo of "Chain of Fools", a song he had written in his youth while singing gospel with his brothers and sisters.  The recording featured Covay singing and playing guitar, overdubbed with himself singing background.

Listening to the demo, Wexler chose to place the song with Aretha Franklin rather than Redding.  It became one of her string of hit singles.

Reception
It reached number one on the U.S. R&B chart, staying there for four weeks. "Chain of Fools" also peaked at number two on the Billboard Hot 100, behind "Judy in Disguise (With Glasses)" by John Fred & His Playboy Band.  It won the Grammy Award for Best Female R&B Vocal Performance, and later a Grammy Hall of Fame Award. In 2004, this song was ranked #249 on Rolling Stone's list of The 500 Greatest Songs of All Time. The trademark tremolo guitar licks at the introduction were played by Joe South. The song was edited for LP & 45; the original long version appeared on the quadrophonic LP The Best of Aretha Franklin in 1973 (later released on a quadrophonic DVD by Rhino in 2010), and on the 1995 Rhino remastering of Lady Soul.  Cash Box said that the song was "a smashing entry that will top both blues and pop charts" with "heavy rhythmic push, and an overwhelming vocal impact."

Live recordings have appeared on the albums Aretha in Paris (1968) and VH1 Divas Live (1998, with Mariah Carey).

Personnel
Aretha Franklin - lead vocals and piano
Jimmy Johnson and Joe South - guitars
Spooner Oldham - Wurlitzer electric piano
Tommy Cogbill - bass
Roger Hawkins - drums
The Sweet Inspirations, Carolyn Franklin, Erma Franklin & Ellie Greenwich - background vocals

Chart positions

{|class="wikitable sortable"
|-
!Charts
!Peakposition
|-
|U.S. Billboard Hot 100
| style="text-align:center;"|2
|-
|U.S. Billboard Hot Rhythm & Blues
| style="text-align:center;"|1 
|-
|RPM Magazine (Can.) Top 100
| style="text-align:center;"|4
|-
|UK Singles Chart
|37
|}

Notable cover versions
 In 1969, Finnish jazz singer Carola tried out rhythm & blues, recording a television video of "Chain of Fools". The tongue-in-cheek choreography by Heikki Värtsi included girl group dancing and Carola whipping a man in a cave.

Uses in pop culture
In 1990, the song was used in the Season Three episode of the TV series Midnight Caller'' entitled "Ryder on the Storm".

References

1967 singles
Songs written by Don Covay
Aretha Franklin songs
Little Richard songs
Mariah Carey songs
Fantasia Barrino songs
Grammy Hall of Fame Award recipients
1967 songs
Song recordings produced by Jerry Wexler
Atlantic Records singles
American rock songs
Cashbox number-one singles